Michael Garza (born February 1, 2000) is an American actor. His most notable roles are starring in the film Scary Stories to Tell in the Dark (2019) as Ramón Morales and also appearing in The Hunger Games: Mockingjay – Part 1 (2014) as Eddy.

Biography 
Garza was born in Texas and is of Mexican and French ancestry.

Garza made his onscreen debut in the 2014 film The Hunger Games: Mockingjay – Part 1 as the role of Eddy. In 2016, he started a series regular role as Frank Armstrong in the second season of the FOX series Wayward Pines (2016). In 2018, he went on to appear in the NBC series Timeless and TBS' Angie Tribeca. In 2019, he was announced as the lead for the 2019 film Scary Stories to Tell in the Dark as Ramón Morales with Zoe Colletti and Dean Norris. In 2020, he guest starred as Milo Garner in the FOX series 9-1-1.

Filmography

Film

Television

References

External links 
 

2000 births
Living people
American people of Mexican descent
American actors
People from Texas